Derxena nivea is a moth of the family Geometridae first described by Theodor Franz Wilhelm Kirsch in 1877. It is found in New Guinea.

References

Desmobathrinae
Moths of New Guinea